The 2013 Arizona Wildcats baseball team represented the University of Arizona in the 2013 NCAA Division I baseball season. The Wildcats played their home games for the 2nd season at Hi Corbett Field. The team was coached by Andy Lopez in his 12th season at Arizona. The program was coming off of a season that saw them win their first College World Series title since 1986.

Personnel

Roster

Coaches

Opening day

Schedule and results

2013 MLB draft

References 

Arizona
Arizona Wildcats baseball seasons
Arizona baseball